In Greek mythology, Chios (Ancient Greek: Χίος) may refer to two possible eponyms of the island of Chios:

 Chios, one of the Oceanids as a daughter of the Titan Oceanus possibly by his sister-wife, Tethys.
 Chios, son of Poseidon and an unnamed Chian nymph. He received his name from the heavy snowfall that occurred while his mother was in labour (cf. Ancient Greek χιών chiōn "snow").

The island could as well have taken its name from the nymph Chione, or simply from the snowy weather.

Notes

Oceanids
Children of Poseidon

References 

 Pausanias, Description of Greece with an English Translation by W.H.S. Jones, Litt.D., and H.A. Ormerod, M.A., in 4 Volumes. Cambridge, MA, Harvard University Press; London, William Heinemann Ltd. 1918. . Online version at the Perseus Digital Library
 Pausanias, Graeciae Descriptio. 3 vols. Leipzig, Teubner. 1903.  Greek text available at the Perseus Digital Library.
 Pliny the Elder, The Natural History. John Bostock, M.D., F.R.S. H.T. Riley, Esq., B.A. London. Taylor and Francis, Red Lion Court, Fleet Street. 1855. Online version at the Perseus Digital Library.
 Pliny the Elder, Naturalis Historia. Karl Friedrich Theodor Mayhoff. Lipsiae. Teubner. 1906. Latin text available at the Perseus Digital Library.
 Stephanus of Byzantium, Stephani Byzantii Ethnicorum quae supersunt, edited by August Meineike (1790-1870), published 1849. A few entries from this important ancient handbook of place names have been translated by Brady Kiesling. Online version at the Topos Text Project.

Demigods in classical mythology